The Sailors Refuge is an historic house situated at 27–29 Queen Square, Bristol, England.

It dates from 1709–1710 and is one of the few remaining houses from the original construction of the square. It was one of the architecturally richer houses, and provides an example of what the more demanding segment of houseowners required.

It is built in an early Georgian naive Palladian style. The classical orders on the facade, though they are conventionally ordered from bottom to top, in the sequence Doric, Ionic, Corinthian, are placed so naively that they have no architectural relationship to the pediments over the windows or the cornice. The lack of any visible support for the window pediments, in the form of columns or projecting architraves, is similarly naive, and not in accord with proper architectural usage.

It has been designated by English Heritage as a grade II* listed building.

References

Georgian architecture in Bristol
Grade II* listed buildings in Bristol
Palladian architecture